The following is a timeline of the history of the city of Salzburg, Austria.

Prior to 18th century

 696 - St Peter's Abbey, Salzburg founded. 
 739 - Roman Catholic diocese of Salzburg established.
 774 - Cathedral built.
 1077 - Hohensalzburg Castle construction begins.
 1167 - Fire.
 1287 - City rights granted.
 1350 -  (church) built.
 1370 - Konrad Taufkind becomes mayor.
 1492 -  (brewery) established.
 1498 - Jews expelled from Salzburg.
 1512 -  (church) built.
 1519 - Hohensalzburg Castle expanded.
 1523 -  (town hall) built.
 1525 - German Peasants' War.
 1587 - Wolf Dietrich Raitenau becomes prince-archbishop.
 1588 -  construction begins on the Residenzplatz.
 1606 - Schloss Altenau built.
 1619 - Hellbrunn Palace built near Salzburg.
 1623 - Paris Lodron University opens.
 1652 -  (library) founded.
 1668 - Cathedral rebuilt.
 1674 -  church consecrated near Salzburg.
 1689 -  (church) rebuilt.
 1697 -  (palace) rebuilt.

18th-19th centuries
 1702 - Holy Trinity Church, Salzburg built.
 1707 - Kollegienkirche, Salzburg (church) built.
 1711 -  (church) built.
 1731 - Protestants expelled from Salzburg.
 1756 - The birth of future composer Mozart at no.9 Getreidegasse.
 1767 -  (tunnel) built through the Mönchsberg.
 1805
 City sacked by French forces.
 Salzburg becomes part of the Austrian Empire.
 1809 - Salzburg becomes part of the Kingdom of Bavaria.
 1816 - Salzburg becomes part of the Austrian Empire again per Treaty of Munich (1816).
 1818 - Fire.
 1849 - Salzburg becomes seat of the Duchy of Salzburg.
 1850 - Museum Carolino-Augusteum active.
 1860 - Salzburg Hauptbahnhof (train station) opens.
 1880 - Mozarteum Foundation established.

 1890 - Population: 27,741.

20th century

 1901 -  built.
 1903 - Volksbibliothek (library) opens.
 1914 - Salzburger AK 1914 football club formed.
 1918 - Hunger protest.
 1920
 Salzburg Festival of theatre and music begins.
 Population: 36,450.
 1926 -  built.
 1933 - SV Austria Salzburg (football club) formed.
 1935 -  and  become part of city.

 1938
 March: Annexation of Austria into Nazi Germany.
 Salzburg becomes seat of the Nazi Reichsgau Salzburg (administrative division).
 1942 - SS Alpenland forced labour subcamp established.
 1944
  begins.
 December: Salzburg-Bomb Detection forced labour subcamp established.
 1945
 12 January: Salzburg-Explosives forced labour subcamp established.
 March: Salzburg-Clearing forced labour subcamp established.
 Bombing of Salzburg ends.
 4 May: American forces take city. Forced labour subcamps dissolved.
 1951 - Population: 102,927.
 1956 -  music event begins.
 1957 -  becomes mayor.
 1960 - Großes Festspielhaus (theatre) opens.
 1962 - Universität Salzburg active.
 1971 - Stadion Lehen (stadium) opens.
 1988 - Salzburg City Archive established.
 1996 - Altstadt designated an UNESCO World Heritage Site.
 1999 - Heinz Schaden becomes mayor.

21st century

 2016 - Population: 150,938 city; 545,815 state.

See also
 Salzburg history
 
 
 List of bishops of Salzburg
 , Roman-era settlement
 
 Timelines of other cities in Austria: Graz, Linz, Vienna

References

This article incorporates information from the German Wikipedia.

Bibliography

in English

 ***Please note that a wikilink to the article on [Salzburg (city)] in [EB1911] is not available***
 + 1871 ed.
 
 

in German

External links

 Items related to Salzburg, various dates (via Europeana)
 Items related to Salzburg, various dates (via Digital Public Library of America)

 
Salzburg
salzburg